Leccinum brunneobadium is a species of bolete fungus in the family Boletaceae. Found in Europe, it was originally described in 1970 by J. Blum as a species of Boletus. Lannoy and Estadès transferred it to the genus Leccinum in 1994.

See also
List of Leccinum species
List of North American boletes

References

Fungi described in 1970
Fungi of Europe
brunneobadium